The 1965 Paris–Tours was the 59th edition of the Paris–Tours cycle race and was held on 10 October 1965. The race started in Paris and finished in Tours. The race was won by Gerben Karstens.

General classification

References

1965 in French sport
1965
1965 Super Prestige Pernod
October 1965 sports events in Europe